Jammu and Kashmir Tourism Development Corporation Limited (JKTDC) is company owned by the Government of Jammu and Kashmir which is entrusted with managing  government hotels and catering establishments. It was set up in 1970 and now has accommodation capacity of 2200 beds per day . The Corporation runs 37 restaurants across the state.

References

External links

Tourism in Jammu and Kashmir
State tourism development corporations of India
State agencies of Jammu and Kashmir
1970 establishments in Jammu and Kashmir
Government agencies established in 1970